The Great Britain national baseball team is the national men's baseball team of the United Kingdom. It is governed by the British Baseball Federation, and is also a member nation of the Confederation of European Baseball.

History
The British team, managed by George McNeil, won the inaugural Baseball World Cup in 1938, beating the United States by four games to one in the series hosted in England. This series was subsequently declared the first world championship of amateur baseball by the International Baseball Federation, and so Great Britain became the first amateur world champions. With the backing of Sir John Moores a team was set to compete in the 1939 series, in Havana, as defending champions. In doing so they would have become the first national representative team to compete outside of the United Kingdom but the outbreak of the Second World War interrupted the development of baseball in the United Kingdom, the team withdrew and the sport entered into decline domestically. So severe was the impact of the Second World War on baseball in the United Kingdom that it was over 70 years before the team qualified for another world championship event, when they reached the 2009 Baseball World Cup by virtue of its second-place finish at the 2007 European Baseball Championship.

In 2007, the Great Britain team won the silver medal at the European Baseball Championship, finishing top of Group B and only losing two games in the tournament. It ultimately finished second overall to the Netherlands. This marked Britain's highest placing in the tournament since its first entry into the event in 1967, when it also finished second.

Prior to 2007 the team's showing in the European Baseball Championship was generally limited to finishing in the lower half of the standings, which often resulted in relegation to the secondary tournament known as the European Baseball Championship Qualifier (sometimes referred to as the 'B-Pool'). In 1988 and 1996 Great Britain hosted and won the Qualifier, thereby returning to the main European Championship event the following year (sometimes referred to as the 'A-Pool'). Since the silver medal in 2007, Great Britain has on occasion had to repeat the process of qualification through the B-Pool.

By winning the silver medal in 2007 Great Britain qualified both for the 2009 Baseball World Cup and for the Final Qualifying Tournament in Taiwan for the 2008 Summer Olympics. However, a lack of funding including a refusal by UK Sport to provide any backing meant it was forced to withdraw from the Final Qualifying Tournament and was replaced by Germany. This was the Great Britain team's last chance to qualify for an Olympic baseball competition due to the earlier decision by the International Olympic Committee (IOC) to remove baseball from the Games after 2008. That decision – announced one day after London had been awarded the 2012 Olympics on 6 July 2005 – also meant that the Great Britain baseball team would not have the opportunity to play in front of a home crowd in the 2012 London Olympics and to promote the sport in the United Kingdom. It also meant that the team ceased to receive elite funding from bodies such as UK Sport.

At the 2009 World Cup – held simultaneously in various countries around Europe – Britain qualified out of the first group stage before eventually finishing 15th overall.  Following the World Cup, in October 2009 the IBAF announced a new set of world rankings in which Britain rose to 21st., though they since dropped to 32nd as of 2017.
Great Britain was invited to compete in the qualifying round of the 2013 World Baseball Classic. In 2016 Hall of Fame inductee Trevor Hoffman joined the coaching staff, honouring his maternal English ancestry, with his grandfather having been a professional footballer in the Football League. Great Britain competed in the qualifying round of the 2017 World Baseball Classic, where it was defeated in the finals by Team Israel.

On September 20, 2022, Great Britain qualified for its first World Baseball Classic by defeating Spain 10–9 in 10 innings in Regensburg, Germany.

Notable figures
Hall of Fame inductee Trevor Hoffman has previously coached the Great Britain national team, as has the English born, highly experienced Major League Baseball player Lance Painter. The most high profile recent player to represent the United Kingdom as a player is Jazz Chisholm Jr. Former major leaguer Vance Worley has also played for the team, starting the qualifying game against Spain in 2022 that clinched a spot in the 2023 World Baseball Classic.

Coaching staff

Current roster 
The team’s roster for the 2023 World Baseball Classic qualification. Very few members of the team were born in Britain, instead qualifying through British parents or grandparents, and almost none of them played in the domestic league.

Results and fixtures
The following is a list of professional baseball match results currently active in the latest version of the WBSC World Rankings, as well as any future matches that have been scheduled.

Legend

2019

2021

2022

2023

Tournament record

World Baseball Classic

Great Britain was invited to compete in the qualifying round of the 2013 World Baseball Classic, where they were grouped Canada and Germany. After an 11–1 defeat to the Canadians, they won against the Czech Republic, 12–5. In the third group game, however, Great Britain lost to Germany. 16–0 down at the 7th inning stretch, they pulled one back before the mercy rule came into effect, and GB exited the qualifiers 16–1.

Baseball World Cup

European Baseball Championship
Team Great Britain have played in 14 tournaments, with a current unbroken streak going back to 1997. The best result a silver medal (1967 and 2007)

Notable among these appearances was 2019, with former MLB pitchers Barry Enright and Michael Roth playing for the team..

References

External links
Official archive for GB senior team
Official archive for GB junior team
British Baseball Federation
Baseball Softball UK

Baseball
National baseball teams
National baseball teams in Europe
 
 
 
 
 
Baseball in the United Kingdom
British baseball players